Closure may refer to:

Conceptual

Psychology
 Closure (psychology), the state of experiencing an emotional conclusion to a difficult life event

Computer science
 Closure (computer programming), an abstraction binding a function to its scope
 Relational database model: Set-theoretic formulation and Armstrong's axioms for its use in database theory

Mathematics
 Closure (mathematics), the result of applying a closure operator
 Closure (topology), for a set, the smallest closed set containing that set

Philosophy
 Epistemic closure, a principle in epistemology
 Deductive closure, a principle in logic
 Cognitive closure, a principle in philosophy of mind
 Closure: A Short History of Everything, a philosophical book by Hilary Lawson

Sociology
 Closure (sociology)
 Closure, a concept in the social construction of technology

Physical objects
 Closure (container) used to seal a bottle, jug, jar, can, or other container
 Closure (wine bottle), a stopper
 Hook-and-eye closure

Arts and entertainment

Film and television
 Straightheads, a 2007 British thriller film, US release title Closure
 "Closure" (The X-Files), a 2000 episode of the television series The X-Files
 "Closure" (8 Simple Rules episode), a 2005 episode of the sitcom 8 Simple Rules
 "Closure" (Raines), a 2007 episode of the crime drama Raines
 "Closure" (Tru Calling), a 2004 episode of the supernatural drama Tru Calling
 A two-part episode, split between seasons 1 and 2 of Law and Order: SVU
 "Closure" (Agents of S.H.I.E.L.D.), a 2015 episode of the television series Agents of S.H.I.E.L.D.

Music
 Closure (band), Canadian rock band
 Closure (video), a 1997 Nine Inch Nails video set

Albums and EPs
 Closure (Attila album), 2021 album by Attila
 Closure (Closure album), 2003 album by Closure
 Closure, 2004 EP by Everclear
 Closure (Integrity album), 2001 album by Integrity
 Closure (Spahn Ranch album), 2001
 Closure: Live, 2001 live album by Theatre of Tragedy

Songs
 "Closure", by Aly & AJ from Insomniatic, 2007
 "Closure", by Asking Alexandria from Reckless & Relentless, 2011
 "Closure", by Botch from The Unifying Themes of Sex, Death and Religion, 1997
 "Closure" (Cadet song), single by Cadet, 2017
 "Closure" (Chevelle song), by Chevelle from Wonder What's Next, 2002
 "Closure", by Divine Heresy from Bleed the Fifth, 2007
 "Closure", by Gabrielle from Always, 2007
 "Closure", single by Hayley Warner, 2015
 "Closure", by Hood from Outside Closer, 2005
 "Closure", by Maroon 5 from Red Pill Blues, 2017
 "Closure", by Opeth from Damnation, 2003
 "Closure" (Scarlett Belle song), single by Scarlett Belle, 2010
 "Closure", by The Story So Far from Under Soil and Dirt, 2011
 "Closure", by Taylor Swift from Evermore, 2020
 "Closure", by Jack & Jack, 2018
 "Closure", by I Prevail from "True Power", 2022

Other arts and entertainment
 Closure (video game), a 2012 puzzle game
 Closure: A Short History of Everything, a philosophical book by Hilary Lawson
 Poetic closure, the sense of conclusion given at the end of a poem

Other uses
 Closure or cloture, a motion in parliamentary procedure to bring debate to a quick end
 Closure (business), the process by which an organization ceases operations

 Closure (atmospheric science), a type of experiment in aerosol and cloud studies

See also
 "C7osure (You Like)", a 2019 song by Lil Nas X
 Clozure, an implementation of Common Lisp
 Clojure, a dialect of Lisp symbiotic with the Java platform